The Dart 16 is a one-design 4.80 m long sailing catamaran. It is designed to be sailed by two people. It races off a Portsmouth Yardstick of 863.

History

Design

The Dart 16 is a modern beach catamaran that is fast, affordable, and seaworthy.
Like most Dart catamarans except for the Dart 20 EXP it lacks the main boom, 
as well as daggerboards, spreaders, and complicated trimming mechanisms.

The lower part of the hulls have skegs typical for a beach catamaran. The most noticeable difference 
to the popular Dart 18 and Sprint 15 catamarans is that the hulls are made out of 
Tecrothene, a thermo plastic. This material is very impact- and scratch-resistant, but somewhat
heavier and harder to repair than fiberglass.
The kick-up rudders are similar to the Hobie 16.

The rigging consists of a rotating aero-dynamically shaped aluminum mast 
held by a forestay and two shroud wires. 
There is a trapeze for the crew.

The mainsail does not have a boom is fully battened and is controlled by a main sheet with a 6:1 
mechanical advantage. The main sheet system has ball-bearing block system with a ratchet and jamming cleat.

The option of a gennaker sail is available.

See also 
 List of multihulls

References

External links
Dart 16 at Performance Sailcraft Europe Ltd 
UKIDA Dart 16 Association

Catamarans
Dinghies
Sailboat types built by LaserPerformance